Rosta may refer to:

Rosta, Iran, a historical district in Isfahan area in Iran
Rosta, Piedmont, a comune in the province of Turin, Piedmont, Italy
Rosta railway station
Rosta, Republic of Dagestan, a rural locality in Russia
Rosta, Örebro, Sweden, a district in the Million Programme
Rosta (river), a river in Murmansk Oblast, Russia
ROSTA, Russian Telegraph Agency, the first Soviet news agency

See also 
 Rasta (disambiguation)
 Roosta (disambiguation)
 Roster (disambiguation)